Ryszard Engelking (born 1935-11-16 in Sosnowiec) is a Polish mathematician. He was working mainly on general topology and dimension theory. He is author of several influential monographs in this field. The 1989 edition of his General Topology is nowadays a standard reference for topology.

Scientific work
Apart from his books, Ryszard Engelking is known, among other things, for a generalization to an arbitrary topological space of the "Alexandroff double circle", for works on completely metrizable spaces, suborderable spaces and generalized ordered spaces.

In addition to research papers authored just by himself, he also published jointly with Kazimierz Kuratowski, Roman Sikorski, Aleksander Pełczyński and others. He has published about 60 scientific works reviewed by MathSciNet and Zentralblatt.

Translation works 
Apart from mathematics he is also interested in literature. He translated into Polish French authors: Flaubert's Madame Bovary, and works of Baudelaire, Gérard de Nerval, Auguste de Villiers de L'Isle-Adam, Nicolas Restif de la Bretonne. For these activities he was awarded by Literatura na Świecie (World Literature).

Bibliography

Notes

External links
 

1935 births
20th-century Polish mathematicians
Topologists
Living people